Jean Boutière (1 November 1898 – 29 January 1967) was a French philologist, specialist in Romance philology. He was born in Mallemort, Bouches-du-Rhône in France.
 
Fascinated by the life and creations of writer Ion Creangă, and by instigation of Mario Roques, professor at the Sorbonne, Boutière has made the work "La vie et l'oeuvre de Ion Creangă" ("The Life of Ion Creangă"), acribios study, his doctorate from the Sorbonne, which he initiated in 1924 and argued as his doctoral thesis on 24 May 1930.

It was also during the interwar period that Jean Boutière published the first-ever French-language monograph on the Romanian writer, originally as a Doctor of Philosophy thesis for the University of Paris. During the thesis work, he corresponded with George T. Kirileanu, Arthur Gorovei, D. Furtună, Garabet Ibrăileanu, which have supported the documentary. 

Jean Boutière was head of the department of the Romanian and then of the Provençal of the Sorbonne.
His works were translated into Romanian by Daniel Corbu.

Jean Boutière was born 1 November 1898 in the area of the department Mallemort, Bouche-du-Rhone. After finishing high school in Marseille, follow the Faculty of letters from Aix and Toulouse, taking his license in 1920. In the same year comes as a young professor of French University Mission in Romania and will teach French language at Emanoil Gojdu University in Oradea, instead of Pascal Zigliara, who was transferred to Cluj.  In Oradea he kept school courses at military administration school.
 
For two years, while he lived in Romania, he learned the Romanian language and made numerous trips to know the beauty of Romanian country, customs and traditions of the Romanian people. In 1924, 
urged by Mario Roques, professor at the Sorbonne, Jean Boutière choose his doctoral thesis the life and works of Ion Creangă, a Romanian novelist. To complete it, enter into a contract with the French teacher G. T. Kirileanu, Artur Gorovei, D. Furtună, Garabet Ibrăileanu, maintained a close correspondence, and they supplied many documents and testimonies about Ion Creangă.

Once completed the work, he defended his doctoral thesis at the Sorbonne on 24 May 1930.

The first major monograph about Ion Creangă was printed in Paris in 1930, having been well received not only in France but also in Romania, where, in 1932, in the report compiled by Mihail Sadoveanu, volume was crowned with the Romanian Academy Award.

Returned to France in 1922, Jean Boutière leaves to replace J. Linard at Oradea, while he functioning as a teacher at "Coeneille" in Rouen, then as head of the department of Romanian language at National School of Oriental languages, living and finally, as the successor of Mario Roques at Sorbonne.

Books
La vie et l'oeuvre de Ion Creangă, Published by Librairie Universitaire J. Gamber Paris, 1930
Viaţa şi opera lui Ion Creangă, Editura Junimea, Iaşi, 1976, în traducerea lui Constantin Ciopraga,.
It is nominated in the "Historical Collections of Libraries" of UNESCO in the Nouvelles roumaines – Anthologie des prosateurs roumains, 1962, preface by Tudor Vianu

References

External links 
 Cornelia Ştefănescu, Mărturii despre Ion Creangă, România Literară, Nr. 15, 2003

1898 births
1967 deaths
University of Paris alumni
People from Bouches-du-Rhône
French philologists
French male writers
Members of the Institute for Catalan Studies
20th-century French male writers
20th-century philologists